Izumo sperm-egg fusion protein 1 (Sperm-specific protein izumo) is encoded in humans by the IZUMO1 gene. In mammalian fertilisation, IZUMO1 binds to its egg receptor counterpart,  Juno, to facilitate recognition and fusion of the gametes.

Function

The sperm-specific protein Izumo, named for a Japanese shrine dedicated to marriage, is essential for sperm-egg plasma membrane binding and fusion. 

Studies have shown that male Izumo knockout mice are sterile because their sperm are unable to fuse to the oocyte membrane.[1] Izumo -/- mice produced morphologically normal sperm that were able to penetrate the zona pellucida, but could not fuse with to the eggs. In fact, it is necessary to relocate the IZUMO1 to the site of oocyte fusion. In-vitro human experiments have also been conducted, suggesting that Izumo is required for human gamete fusion. [1]

Through the use of Western Blot analyses, it has been shown that Izumo is only expressed in the testis and is found on mature spermatozoa.  Izumo-1 located on mature spermatozoa that have undergone capacitation binds to its receptor Juno, which is located on the oolemma of eggs.

References

Further reading